Galsi Mahavidyalaya, is the general degree college in Galsi, Purba Bardhaman district, established in 2007 by CPIM Government (new campus ) . It offers undergraduate courses in arts. It is affiliated to University of Burdwan.

Departments

Arts

Bengali
English
Sanskrit
History
philosophy
political science
Geography

See also

References

External links
Galsi Mahavidyalaya

Universities and colleges in Purba Bardhaman district
Colleges affiliated to University of Burdwan
Educational institutions established in 2007
2007 establishments in West Bengal